Bellshill railway station is a railway station in the town of Bellshill, North Lanarkshire, Scotland. The station is managed by ScotRail and served by Argyle Line and Shotts Line services. The station is adjacent to Bellshill Main Street, on Hamilton Road, and was opened by the Caledonian Railway as part of the Cleland and Midcalder Line on 1 May 1879. West of the station, the Glasgow, Bothwell, Hamilton and Coatbridge Railway crossed with a second station in the town to the north west - this ceased to carry passengers back in 1951.

The line through the station was electrified as part of the 1974 West Coast Main Line project.

Services

The service Mondays-Saturdays is:

 2tph to Edinburgh Waverley via Shotts
 2tph to Lanark via Motherwell
 4tph to Glasgow Central High Level

There are additional peak trains to Anderston via Central L.L. and to Carstairs (both via Shieldmuir and via Holytown), and infrequent services on the North Berwick Line.

On a Sunday, the pattern is as follows:

 1tph to Lanark via Motherwell
 1tph to Motherwell
 1tp2h to Edinburgh Waverley
 2tph to Glasgow Central

References

Bibliography 

 
 
 
 
 RAILSCOT on Cleland and Midcalder Line
 Bellshill railway station on historic OS Map

Bellshill
Railway stations in North Lanarkshire
Former Caledonian Railway stations
Railway stations in Great Britain opened in 1879
Railway stations served by ScotRail
SPT railway stations